Francisco Soler may refer to:

 Francisco Soler Atencia (born 1970), Spanish retired footballer
 Francisco Soler (wrestler) (born 1992), Puerto Rican sport wrestler
 Francisco Soler Valero, Spanish lawyer and politician